was a province of Japan in the area of Japan that is today includes most of modern Mie Prefecture. Ise bordered on Iga, Kii, Mino, Ōmi, Owari, Shima, and Yamato Provinces.

History
The name of Ise appears in the earliest written records of Japan, and was the site of numerous religious and folkloric events connected with the Shinto religion and Yamato court. Ise province was one of the original provinces of Japan established in the Nara period under the Taihō Code, when the former princely state of Ise was divided into Ise, Iga and Shima. The original capital of the province was located in what is now the city of Suzuka, and was excavated by archaeologists in 1957. The site was proclaimed a national historic landmark in 1986. The remains of the Ise kokubunji have also been found within the boundaries of modern Suzuka. Under the Engishiki classification system, Ise was ranked as a "great country" and a "close country".

Two Shinto shrines in Ise Province compete for the title of Ichinomiya: Tsubaki Grand Shrine and the Tsubaki Jinja, both of which are located in Suzuka. The Ise Grand Shrine, located in what is now the city of Ise was the destination of pilgrims from the Heian period through modern times.

During the Muromachi period, Ise was ruled nominally by the Kitabatake clan. After the establishment of the Tokugawa shogunate, Ise was divided into several feudal han, the largest of which was Tsu Domain.  During the Edo period, the Tōkaidō road from Edo to Kyoto passed through northern Ise, with post stations at several locations.

At the time of the Bakumatsu period, the feudal domains within Ise Province included the following:

After the start of the Meiji period, with the abolition of the han system in 1871, Ise was joined with former Iga and Shima provinces to form the new Mie Prefecture formally created on April 18, 1876.

The name "Ise Province" continued to exist as a geographical anachronism for certain official purposes.  For example, Ise is explicitly recognized in treaties in 1894 (a) between Japan and the United States and (b) between Japan and the United Kingdom.

The World War II  and modern helicopter carrier Ise are named after this province.

Historical districts
 Mie Prefecture
 Anki District – merged with Kawawa District to become Kawage District (河芸郡) on March 29, 1896; which it merged with Anō District to become Age District on September 30, 1956
 Anō District – merged with Kawage District to become Age District on September 30, 1956
 Asake District – merged into Mie District on March 29, 1896
 Ichishi District – dissolved
 Iino District – merged with Iitaka District to become Iinan District (飯南郡) on March 29, 1896
 Iitaka District – merged with Iino District to become Iinan District on March 29, 1896
 Inabe District
 Kawawa District – merged with Anki District to become Kawage District on March 29, 1896; which it merged with Anō District to become Age District on September 30, 1956
 Kuwana District
 Mie District – absorbed Asake District on March 29, 1896
 Suzuka District – dissolved
 Taki District
 Watarai District

Notes

See also
Ise city

References
 Nussbaum, Louis-Frédéric and Käthe Roth. (2005).  Japan encyclopedia. Cambridge: Harvard University Press. ;  OCLC 58053128
 Papinot, Edmond. (1910). Historical and Geographic Dictionary of Japan. Tokyo: Librarie Sansaisha. OCLC 77691250

External links 

  Murdoch's map of provinces, 1903

Former provinces of Japan
History of Mie Prefecture
Tokaido (region)